U (う in hiragana or ウ in katakana) is one of the Japanese kana, each of which represents one mora. In the modern Japanese system of alphabetical order, they occupy the third place in the modern Gojūon (五十音) system of collating kana. In the Iroha, they occupied the 24th position, between む and ゐ. In the Gojūon chart (ordered by columns, from right to left), う lies in the first column (あ行, "column A") and the third row (う段, "row U"). Both represent the sound . In the Ainu language, the small katakana ゥ represents a diphthong, and is written as w in the Latin alphabet.

The hiragana form with dakuten, ゔ, representing the sound "v", is rarely seen on older words, since the sound does not occur in native Japanese words. However, it is becoming more common with Western influences.

Derivation
Both う and ウ originate, via man'yōgana, from the kanji 宇 (pronounced u and meaning space).

Variant forms
Scaled-down versions of the characters (ぅ, ゥ) are used to create new morae that do not exist in the Japanese language, such as トゥ (tu). This convention is relatively new, and many older loanwords do not use it. For example, in the phrase Tutankhamun's cartouche, the recent loan cartouche uses the new phonetic technique, but the older loan Tutankhamun uses ツ (tsu) as an approximation:

ツタンカーメン の カルトゥーシュTsutankāmen no karutūshu

The character う is also used, in its full-sized form, to lengthen "o" sounds. For example, the word 構想 is written in hiragana as こうそう (kousou), pronounced kōsō. In a few words the character お (o) is used instead for morphological or historical reasons.

The character ウ can take dakuten to form ヴ (vu), a sound foreign to the Japanese language and traditionally approximated by ブ (bu).

In hentaigana a variant of う is appeared that retains cursive Kanji 宇.

Stroke order

The hiragana う is written in two strokes:
 At the top of the character, a short diagonal crook: proceeding diagonally downwards from the left, then reversing direction and ending at the lower left.
 A broad curving stroke: beginning at the left, rising slightly, then curving back and ending at the left.

The katakana ウ is written in three strokes:
 At the top of the character, a short vertical stroke, written from top to bottom.
 A similar stroke, but lower and positioned at the left.
 A broad angled stroke: beginning as a horizontal line written from left to right, then reversing direction and proceeding downwards from right to left as a curved diagonal. The horizontal line must touch both the other strokes. Apart from the short diagonal, the character is identical to フ.

Other communicative representations

 Full Braille representation

 When lengthening "-u" or "-o" syllables in Japanese braille, a Chōonpu is always used, as in standard katakana usage instead of adding an う / ウ.

 Computer encodings

References

Specific kana